Dunaliellaceae is a family of algae in the order Chlamydomonadales.

Genera
As accepted by GBIF;
 Aulacomonas (1)
 Dunaliella  (5)
 Hafniomonas  (2)
 Phyllocardium  (1)
 Polytomella  (3)
 Quadrichloris  (1)
 Spermatozopsis  (1)

Figures in brackets are approx. how many species per genus.

Uncertain genera, (with no listed species); Apiochloris , Chloronephris , Hyaliella , Hyalocardium , Medusochloris , Papenfussiomonas , Platella ,  Silvamonas   and Ulochloris

References

Chlorophyceae families
Chlamydomonadales